Olympus Airways is a Greek charter airline offering ACMI-leasing, charter and ad-hoc flights headquartered in Agia Paraskevi.

History
Olympus Airways secured its Air Operators Certificate (AOC) from the Hellenic Civil Aviation Authority (HCAA) in 2015. The company commenced operations with a single Boeing 737-500 in October 2015 offering charter flights between Greece and Germany.

Olympus Airways has since grown its fleet to consist of two Airbus A321-200 passenger aircraft and two Boeing 757-200PCF freight aircraft. Olympus Airways lease their aircraft to other airlines on an ACMI wet lease basis. They have operated for the TUI Group, Congo Airways, and many other airlines worldwide. 

Their main office is based in Athens.

Fleet

As of September 2022, the Olympus Airways fleet consists of the following aircraft:

References

External links

Airlines of Greece
Airlines established in 2014
Companies based in Athens
Aviation in Greece
Greek brands
Greek companies established in 2014